Jiang Wenjun (born 30 January 1990) is a Chinese footballer who currently plays as a left-back for Kunshan.

Club career 
Jiang Wenjun started his professional career with China League One side Shanghai Zobon in 2007. He would gradually start to establish himself within the team before he transferred to China League One side Dalian Aerbin on 9 March 2011, on a free transfer. He would be part of the team that won promotion to the top tier at the 2011 China League One campaign. On 11 March 2012, Jiang made his top tier debut for Dalian Aerbin in the 2012 Chinese Super League against Tianjin Teda in a 1-0 defeat.

In March 2013, Jiang moved to China League Two side Qingdao Hainiu. He would establish himself as a vital member of the team that went of to win the division and promotion to the second tier. Jiang joined Hebei China Fortune in 2015, initially joining the reserve team he was promoted to the first team in the summer of 2016. He made his debut for Hebei on 29 June 2016 in the fourth round of 2016 Chinese FA Cup against Shijiazhuang Ever Bright with a 3–2 win. After several season with Hebei he join second tier club Kunshan and was part of the squad that won the division and promotion to the top tier at the end of the 2022 China League One campaign.

Career statistics 
.

Honours

Club
Dalian Aerbin
China League One: 2011

Qingdao Hainiu
China League Two: 2013

Kunshan
 China League One: 2022

References

External links
 

Living people
1990 births
Chinese footballers
Footballers from Liaoning
Pudong Zobon players
Dalian Professional F.C. players
Qingdao F.C. players
Hebei F.C. players
Chinese Super League players
China League One players
China League Two players
Association football fullbacks